Michael Clayton Creagh (25 May 1845 – 27 May 1895) was a New Zealand cricketer. He played one first-class match for Otago in 1866/67.

Creagh was born in Ireland in 1845. He worked as a solicitor.

References

External links
 

1845 births
1895 deaths
New Zealand cricketers
Otago cricketers